The 20 Party Alliance was a Bangladeshi coalition of right-wing political parties, led by the Bangladesh Nationalist Party. It was originally formed as the 18 Party Alliance on 18 April 2012 in Dhaka, extending its predecessor the Four Party Alliance. The 20 Party Alliance was formed as an effort to strengthen the opposition's demands for restoring the caretaker government system used between 1996 and 2008. The main rival of this alliance is the Grand Alliance, led by Awami League which came into power after the election in 2008.

The BNP are simultaneously in Jatiya Oikya Front and this alliance.

History 
The Four Party Alliance was a political grouping in the Jatiyo Sangshad, or National Assembly of Bangladesh.  It was formed in 1999 for the 2001 election, and consisted of the Bangladesh Nationalist Party, Jamaat-e-Islami Bangladesh, Bangladesh Jatiya Party (Najiur)  and Islami Oikya Jote.  The alliance won a substantial majority in 2001, but was heavily defeated by the Awami League-led Grand Alliance of Bangladesh in 2008. On 18 April 2012, the Four Party Alliance was extended and took the new name 18 Party Alliance.

2001 

In the 2001 Bangladeshi general election, the Four Party Alliance won 214 of the 300 seats in parliament.

Total seats: 300

Four Party Alliance : 214

Bangladesh Awami League: 62

Islami Jatiya Oikya Front(Jatiya Party): 14

Independents and others : 14

2008 

In the 2008 Bangladeshi general election, the Four Party Alliance won 33 of the 300 seats in parliament.

Total seats: 300

Four Party Alliance : 33

Grand Alliance: 263

Independents and others : 04

Members 
 Bangladesh Jatiya Party (Japa Andaleeve)
 Bangladesh Jamaat-e-Islami (BJI) (registration cancelled in 2013)
 Liberal Democratic Party - LDP (quit alliance in 2020)
 Islami Oikya Jote (quit alliance in 2017)
 Khelafat Majlish (quit alliance in 2021) 
 Jatiya Ganatantrik Party-JAGPA (registration rejected in 2021)
 Bangladesh Kalyan Party
 National People's Party-NPP
 Bangladesh National Awami Party-Bangladesh NAP (quit alliance in 2018)
 Jamiote-Olamaye-Islam Bangladesh (quit alliance in 2021)
 National Democratic Party-NDP (quit alliance in 2018)
 Bangladesh Labour Party
 Bangladesh Muslim League - BML
 Bangladesh Islamic Party
 National Awami Party-Bhasani (NAP-Bhasani)
 Democratic League-DL
 Bangladesh People's League

See also
Bangladeshi nationalism
Politics of Bangladesh
List of political parties in Bangladesh
Grand Alliance
Jatiya Oikya Front
Hartal in Bangladesh

References

Political party alliances in Bangladesh
Political parties established in 1978

History of Bangladesh (1971–present)